Karczówka may refer to the following places:
Karczówka, Kuyavian-Pomeranian Voivodeship (north-central Poland)
Karczówka, Przysucha County in Masovian Voivodeship (east-central Poland)
Karczówka, Zwoleń County in Masovian Voivodeship (east-central Poland)
Karczówka, Lubusz Voivodeship (west Poland)